Chaos! Comics was a comic book publisher that operated from 1993 until 2002, mostly focusing on horror comics. Their titles included Lady Death, Purgatori, Evil Ernie, Chastity, Jade, Bad Kitty, and Lady Demon. Chaos! creators included Brian Pulido, Steven Hughes, Al Rio, Mike Flippin, Justiniano, and Hart D. Fisher.

Chaos also published licensed comics for the World Wrestling Federation (WWF, now WWE) and several bands. It was revived by Dynamite Entertainment as their imprint as Chaos! Dynamite Where Dynamite owns the rights to the characters expect Lady Death who was replaced by Lady Hel.

History 
Chaos was founded in 1993 in Scottsdale, Arizona, and published its first title that same year. Writer Brian Pulido was the company's president.

The company dealt with a copyright infringement accusation in 1997, when horror writer Nancy A. Collins claimed they'd based the Chastity character and storyline on her character Sonja Blue.

Chaos Comics filed bankruptcy in late 2002, with all characters (save Lady Death) being sold off to comic retailer Tales of Wonder, who sold the rights to Devil's Due Publishing. After the demise of Devil's Due Publishing, the rights to the Chaos! Comics characters went to Dynamite Entertainment.

Prior to the bankruptcy, rights to Lady Death were sold to CrossGen Entertainment, and prior to CrossGen's bankruptcy, those rights were sold to Brian Pulido and Avatar Press, who founded the imprint Boundless Comics solely for Lady Death-comics.

Due to Lady Death not being part of the sell, Dynamite created Lady Hel to replace Lady Death. Lady Hel will be getting her own comic.

Notable titles
Purgatori
Chastity
Evil Ernie
Jade
Lady Death
Lady Demon
Bad Kitty
Lady Hel

Licensed properties

Band-based comics
The Cryptic Writings of Megadeth
The Insane Clown Posse - The Pendulum
Static-X: Machine

WWF characters

Chyna
The Rock
Mankind
Stone Cold Steve Austin
The Undertaker

Films
Halloween
The Mummy

Doomsday
Doomsday was a one-off thrash metal album released in 1995 by the company.  The album features a trio, originally from Van Nuys, California but who, at some time between 1995 and 1997, moved to Phoenix, Arizona, playing energetic bass heavy thrash.  The CD was released in limited quantity to help promote the Lady Death and Evil Ernie comic franchises.  The album cover features Evil Ernie beneath the Doomsday logo.  The trio played at DragonCon '97, but had little or no commercial success beyond this. Doomsday also played At ChillerCon, NJ in 1997 with Scream Queen Tiffany Shepis co-starring on the stage performance as the maiden victim.

Track listing
"Inceptive Psychosis" 1:12
"Beyond Death" 5:19
"Cyborg Killing Machine" 3:38
"Who Am I" 4:46
"Black Sorrow" 4:21
"Resurrection" 4:02
"Chaos! Rules" 3:40
"Lost Insanity" 5:15
"I Dream" 3:54
"I Am Dead" 1:52
"Take A Shot" 1:58
"No Pickles" 0:21

Members
Mike Flippin guitars and vocals
Dave Chaney bass guitar
Johhny Ogle percussion

Notes

External links
 

 
1993 establishments in Arizona
Publishing companies established in 1993
Companies based in Scottsdale, Arizona
Comic book publishing companies of the United States
Companies disestablished in 2002
Defunct comics and manga publishing companies